The Richmond River is a river situated in the Northern Rivers region of New South Wales, Australia.

Course and features

The river rises at the northern end of the Richmond Range, near its junction with the McPherson Range, on the Queensland/ New South Wales border, west of Mount Lindesay, and flows generally south east and north east, joined by twelve tributaries, including the Wilsons River, before reaching its mouth at its confluence with the Coral Sea of the South Pacific Ocean near Ballina; descending  over its  course.

On its journey it passes through the towns of Kyogle, Casino, Coraki and Woodburn. Summerland Way is situated adjacent to much of the middle reaches of the course of Richmond River. At Ballina, the Pacific Highway crosses the river.

History

Aboriginal history
The traditional custodians of the land surrounding the Richmond River are the Aboriginal people of the Githabul, whose territory reached north to the current city of Toowoomba and included the current towns of Tenterfield and Warwick. One of the annual rituals of the Githabul people was the movement from the mountain ranges to the coast during the winter months, when the mullet were plentiful.

European history
Omitted by Captain James Cook when he sailed up the east coast of the Australian mainland in 1770, it wasn't until Captain Henry John Rous identified the mouth of the river in 1828 that it was discovered by Europeans.  Rous entered the river and sailed about  up river. He subsequently named the river Richmond after the fifth Duke of Richmond. Later that year the explorer Allan Cunningham reached the river by land.

The river was a major port from the 1840s until well into the 20th century. Soon after the first white settlers arrived they discovered the abundant supply of Australian Red Cedar in the Richmond Valley and immediately began logging.  The river was vital in the transportation of this resource.

At the time of its discovery in 1828 and until the late 1890s the river had a treacherous mouth of shifting sand bars, and many ships and people died on it.  Understandably, a decision was made to construct two breakwaters to channel the river's flow and these were completed in the early 1900s.  The construction of the breakwaters also led to the formation of Shaw's Bay (after sand built up behind what is now called Lighthouse or Main Beach).

In 1846, a conflict between white settlers and local Aborigines in the river valley (the Richmond River massacre) caused the deaths of around 100 of the latter.

With the decline of shipping as a transport mode, owing to better roads and rail, and the closing of the North Coast Steam Navigation Company (the major shipping firm of the area) in 1954, the river became less important as a port.

Current usage
For boats, the river is navigable for a short way up its length, possibly as far as Casino.

The Richmond River is heavily used for irrigation along its length. Several weirs have been constructed in order to mitigate the effects of flooding, most notably at Casino.

Fauna
The freshwater reaches of the Richmond River once supported the endemic Richmond River Cod, similar to Murray Cod and possibly a subspecies of Eastern Freshwater Cod. Unfortunately this unique native fish became extinct between the 1930s and 1950s due to habitat degradation and gross overfishing, including with dynamite during the building of the local railway line.  The endangered Oxleyan Pygmy Perch has been recorded from the river.

See also

 Rivers of New South Wales
 List of rivers of Australia
 Border Ranges National Park
 Richmond Range National Park

References

External links
 
Richmond River County Council
Northern Rivers Catchment Management Authority

 

Rivers of New South Wales
Northern Rivers
Coastline of New South Wales
Kyogle Council